Chiloglottis platyptera, commonly known as the winged ant orchid or Barrington Tops ant orchid, is a species of orchid endemic to the New England Tableland of New South Wales. It has two broad leaves and a single greenish brown flower with a callus of many glands covering most of the top of the labellum.

Description
The labellum is shaped like a bricklayer's trowel with the narrower end towards the base. Flowering occurs from September to November.

Taxonomy and naming
Chiloglottis platyptera was first formally described in 1991 by David Jones from a specimen collected in Barrington Tops National Park and the description was published in Australian Orchid Research. The specific epithet (platyptera) is derived from the Ancient Greek words platys meaning "broad, wide, flat (or) level" and pteron meaning "feather" or "wing", referring to the brown wings on the column of this orchid.

Distribution and habitat
The winged ant orchid grows with grass in tall forest and on the edges of rainforest between Dungog and Yarrowitch, including in the Barrington Tops, Oxley Wild Rivers and Ben Halls Gap National Parks.

Conservation
Chiloglottis platyptera is listed as "vulnerable" under the New South Wales Government Biodiversity Conservation Act 2016. The main threats to the species are grazing by domestic stock, weed invasion (especially by scotch broom), the activities of feral pigs and land clearing.

References

External links 

platyptera
Orchids of New South Wales
Plants described in 1991